The second season of Schitt's Creek a Canadian television sitcom created by Daniel Levy and father Eugene Levy premiered on January 12, 2016, and concluded on March 29, 2016, on CBC Television. The season aired 13 episodes and saw the return of the characters Johnny Rose, Moira Rose, David Rose & Alexis Rose. The season was once again produced by Not a Real Company Productions.

The season featured the same starring cast that was introduced during the first season, however now Dustin Milligan was promoted from starring to regular status. Robin Duke joined the series as a regular character named Wendy.

On February 17, 2016, the CBC announced they renewed the show for a third season.

Cast and characters

Main 
 Eugene Levy as Johnny Rose
 Catherine O'Hara as Moira Rose
 Daniel Levy as David Rose
 Annie Murphy as Alexis Rose
 Jennifer Robertson as Jocelyn Schitt
 Tim Rozon as Mutt Schitt
 Emily Hampshire as Stevie Budd
 Dustin Milligan as Ted Mullens
 Chris Elliott as Roland Schitt

Starring 
 Sarah Levy as Twyla Sands
 John Hemphill as Bob Currie
 Karen Robinson as Ronnie Lee
 Rizwan Manji as Ray Butani
 Robin Duke as Wendy Kurtz

Recurring 
 Marilyn Bellfontaine as Gwen Currie

Special Guest Stars 
 Shakura S'Aida as Lena
 Lili Conner as Grace
 Jasmin Geljo as Ivan
 Steve Lund as Jake
 Sarah Power as Tennessee
 John Bourgeois as Don Taylor
 Sherry Miller as Bev Taylor

Episodes

Reception and release

Critical response 
Much like the first season, the second season of Schitt's Creek was positively received, gaining an approval rating from Rotten Tomatoes of 100%. Along with the rest of the series, the season grew in popularity after debuting on Netflix in January 2017.

Awards and nominations 

The second season received 13 nominations at the 5th Canadian Screen Awards, as well as other award wins and nominations for individual actors and directors.

Release 
The season premiered on January 12, 2016, and with a two-episode premiere, the season concluded on March 29, 2016, with 13 episodes. Starting in the season, the American distributed of the series, Pop TV, moved the series to an 8:00 pm ET/PT time slot with an encore broadcast at 11:00 pm ET/PT.

Notes

References 

Schitt's Creek
2016 Canadian television seasons